Northland is a historic railroad passenger car built in 1916 for the Duluth, Missabe and Northern Railway to transport managers and important guests.  The car was listed on the National Register of Historic Places in 1978 for its state-level significance in the theme of transportation.  It was nominated for being one of the last operating examples of a private business railcar.

In 2003 Northland was acquired by the Lake Superior Railroad Museum and moved to the Duluth Depot in Duluth, Minnesota.

See also
 National Register of Historic Places listings in St. Louis County, Minnesota

References

National Register of Historic Places in St. Louis County, Minnesota
Pullman Company
Rail transportation on the National Register of Historic Places in Minnesota
Rail passenger cars of the United States
Railway vehicles on the National Register of Historic Places
Transportation in Duluth, Minnesota
Private railroad cars